Hallsville is an unincorporated community in Barnett Township, DeWitt County, Illinois, United States.

Geography

References

Unincorporated communities in Illinois
Unincorporated communities in DeWitt County, Illinois